Francisco Fernández Carvajal or Francis Fernandez (born 1938 in Granada) is a Spanish Roman Catholic priest in the Opus Dei Prelature and author of several books.

He is best known for his seven volume work Hablar con Dios (In Conversation with God), which has sold over two million copies in several languages, including Spanish, English, French, Italian, Portuguese, German, Croatian, Dutch, Romanian, Slovakian and Polish. It consists of over 450 meditations, one or more for every day of the year, as well as three meditations for each Sunday, corresponding to the three-year cycle in the Catholic lectionary. An updated, four volume edition with over 550 meditations was completed in 2004.

He is a graduate in history from the University of Navarra, and holds a doctorate in Canon law from the Angelicum in Rome. In 1961 Carvajal earned a Doctorate in Canon Law from the Pontifical University of Saint Thomas Aquinas, Angelicum with a dissertation entitled Evolución historico-juridica de la autonomia interna en las congregaciones religiosas.

He was ordained a priest in 1964, and has ministered especially to university students throughout his career. Carvajal was an editor of the magazine Revista Palabra  for over 10 years, from the early 1980s to the mid-1990s.

Books
 Hablar con Dios (Ediciones Palabra, 1988) Obra en 7 tomos; 
 New edition: (Ediciones Palabra, 2004) Obra en 4 tomos; 
 English edition: In Conversation with God (Scepter Publications, 1993) 7 volume set; 
 Portuguese edition: Falar com Deus (Quadrante) 7 volume set; 
 Antología de textos (Ediciones Palabra, 2005)
 El día que cambié mi vida (Ediciones Palabra, 2005)
 Como quieras Tú. Cuarenta meditaciones sobre la Pasión del Señor (Ediciones Palabra, 2005)
 Quédate conmigo. Vivir de la Eucaristía (Ediciones Palabra, 2005)
 La dirección espiritual (Ediciones Palabra, 2003)
 Hijos de Dios (Ediciones Palabra, 2003)
 English edition: Children of God: The Life of Spiritual Childhood Preached by Blessed Josemaria Escriva (Scepter Publications, 1998)  
 Donde duerme la ilusión. La lucha contra la tibieza (Ediciones Palabra, 2006)
 La tibieza (Ediciones Palabra, 2002) 
 English edition: Lukewarmness: The Devil in Disguise (Scepter Publications, 2002) 
 Vida de Jesús (Ediciones Palabra, 1997)

References

External links
 Francisco Fernandez Carvajal's website

1938 births
Living people
Fernandez
Fernandez
University of Navarra alumni
Pontifical University of Saint Thomas Aquinas alumni
21st-century Spanish Roman Catholic priests
Spanish non-fiction writers
Roman Catholic writers
Spanish magazine editors